Paul Evans is an American politician. He has served in the Oregon House of Representatives since 2015, representing District 20, which includes parts of Marion and Polk counties. He was the mayor of Monmouth from 1999 to 2002.

Biography
Evans earned his B.S. in Public Policy and Administration from Western Oregon University in 1992 and his M.A. in Interdisciplinary Studies (Environmental Policy, Rhetoric and Social Influence, and American Politics) from Oregon State University in 2001. His professional experience includes working as a volunteer fireman with the Polk County Fire District #1, a teacher at Western Oregon University, Chemeketa Community College and Oregon State University and President of Northwest Passage Trading Company. He served in the United States Air Force from 1993 to 1997, and in the Oregon Air National Guard from 1997-Jul 2010. Evans served in the United States Air Force for 20 years before retiring in 2013. During that time, he participated in combat missions in Afghanistan and Iraq, including Operation Enduring Freedom and Operation Iraqi Freedom.

In 2014, Evans defeated Republican candidate Kathy Goss, becoming the only Democrat to win a seat previously held by a Republican in the Oregon House of Representatives that year. In 2016, he retained his seat by defeating Republican challenger Laura Morett. In 2018 he defeated Republican challenger Selma Pierce to retain his seat for a third term.

References

External links
 Campaign website
 Legislative website

21st-century American politicians
Air University (United States Air Force) alumni
Living people
Mayors of places in Oregon
Oregon city council members
Oregon State University alumni
Democratic Party members of the Oregon House of Representatives
People from Polk County, Oregon
Politicians from Salem, Oregon
United States Air Force officers
Western Oregon University alumni
Year of birth missing (living people)
Military personnel from Oregon